The 2009 Irish Classic (often known as the 2009 Lucan Racing Irish Classic for sponsorship and promotion purposes) was a professional non-ranking snooker tournament that took place between 24 and 26 July 2009 at the Celbridge Snooker Club in Kildare, Republic of Ireland.

Joe Swail won in the final 5–0 against Fergal O'Brien.


Round-robin stage

Group one

Table

Results:
 Fergal O'Brien 3–5 Ken Doherty
 Fergal O'Brien 5–0 David Morris
 Joe Swail 5–2 Ken Doherty
 David Morris 1–5 Joe Swail
 David Morris 2–5 Ken Doherty
 Fergal O'Brien 5–3 Joe Swail

Group two

Table
Table

Results:
 Michael Judge 4–5 Brendan O'Donoghue
 Joe Delaney 3–5 Michael Judge
 Patrick Wallace 4–5 Brendan O'Donoghue
 Joe Delaney 0–5 Brendan O'Donoghue
 Michael Judge 5–3 Patrick Wallace
 Joe Delaney 5–4 Patrick Wallace

Knock-out stage

Century breaks

132, 113  Fergal O'Brien
118, 108, 104  Joe Swail
115  Brendan O'Donoghue
106  Ken Doherty

References

2009
Irish Classic
Classic